Zumba Fitness Core is the third video game in the installment of the Fitness series, based on the Zumba program. It is also the sequel Zumba Fitness 2 (2011), later followed by Zumba Fitness: World Party (2013). It is developed by Zoë Mode and published by Majesco Entertainment. It was released on 16 October 2012. Unlike previous games, the game mainly focus on the abdomen.

Gameplay
Players practice various dances, led by Zumba creator Beto Perez and celebrity instructors Gina Grant and Tanya Bardsley as well as new characters Loretta Bates and Nicholas Logrea.

References

2012 video games
Dance video games
Fitness games
Kinect games
Majesco Entertainment games
Music video games
Unreal Engine games
Wii games
Xbox 360 games
Video games developed in the United Kingdom
Video game sequels
Multiplayer and single-player video games
Zoë Mode games